Apoderoceras is an extinct genus of cephalopod belonging to the ammonite subclass.

Biostratigraphic significance 
The International Commission on Stratigraphy (ICS) has assigned the First Appearance Datum of genus Apoderoceras and of Bifericeras donovani the defining biological marker for the start of the Pliensbachian Stage of the Jurassic, 190.8 ± 1.0 million years ago.

Distribution
Jurassic of Argentina, Hungary, Italy, Portugal, the United Kingdom

References

Eoderoceratoidea
Ammonitida genera
Jurassic ammonites of Europe
Pliensbachian life